Harrison Township is a township in Grundy County, in the U.S. state of Missouri.

Harrison Township has the name of William Henry Harrison, 9th President of the United States.

References

Townships in Missouri
Townships in Grundy County, Missouri